Belga was a Belgian brand of cigarettes that was owned and manufactured by British American Tobacco.

History
The brand was launched in 1923 by the tobacco vendors Alphonse and François Vander Elst. After World War I ended, Alphonse and François Vander Elst wanted to launch a brand which the Belgians could be proud of. The new brand was named after the then currency Belga, exactly the price of a pack. In addition, the brand name was adorned in the Belgian tricolour in order to stir up patriotic feelings of the citizens. Soon Belga grew into the most popular brand of Belgium. In 1941, the brand was removed from the market for a few years after the German occupation of Belgium during World War II because of its patriotic character.

The brand was known for its iconic image, designed by Leo Marfurt, of a lady with a yellow scarf and black hat with a yellow feather standing against a red background. Paula Colfs-Bollaert, from Antwerp, was the model. Advertising posters invariably showed a smoking woman: the American illustrator Lawrence Sterne Stevens made a well-known poster depicting Netta Duchâteau as a flapper in 1930.

In 1990, the woman's head was removed from the packet, but later returned in a modified form in 2005.

In 2004, the cigarette factory Tabacofina-Vander Elst located in Merksem closed its doors and moved production to the Netherlands.

In June 2014, it was announced that the brand would be pulled off the shelves and replaced by Lucky Strike.

Main market was Belgium. Other markets were Luxembourg, the Netherlands and Spain.

See also

 Tobacco smoking

References

1923 establishments in Belgium
2014 disestablishments in Belgium
2014 disestablishments in the Netherlands
Belgian brands
British American Tobacco brands
1923 introductions
Flappers